Faletići is a village in the municipalities of Istočni Stari Grad (Republika Srpska) and Stari Grad Sarajevo, Bosnia and Herzegovina.

Demographics 
According to the 2013 census, its population was 297, with 35 of them living in the Republika Srpska part and 262 living in the Federation part.

References

Populated places in Stari Grad, Sarajevo
Populated places in Istočni Stari Grad
Villages in Republika Srpska